Total Television was an American animation studio founded in 1959 by Buck Biggers, Chester "Chet" Stover, Joe Harris, and Treadwell D. Covington. They were executives in the advertising agency Dancer Fitzgerald Sample who had the account for the General Mills food corporation.  Total was formed to create cartoon characters encouraging children to buy General Mills breakfast cereals and other products. The company mostly created cartoons for television networks such as NBC. Underdog, King Leonardo and His Short Subjects, and Tennessee Tuxedo and His Tales were among the most popular series made by the studio.

Production and Shows
The studio produced animated series from 1959 to 1969 at Gamma Productions, a primitive start-up company, which was contracted to produce the animation for Jay Ward Productions' output. Ward was never satisfied with the work performed at Gamma.

Gamma Productions is the animation studio who is notable for their work on Underdog (1964), Tennessee Tuxedo and His Tales (1963), Commander McBragg (1963) and Go Go Gophers (1964).
Cocoa Puffs commercials (1960-1969)
King Leonardo and His Short Subjects (1960–1963)
The Hunter (1960–1963)
Commander McBragg (1963–1965)
Go Go Gophers (1964-1966)
Klondike Kat (1963–1965)
Tennessee Tuxedo and His Tales (1963–1966)
The Beagles (1966–1967)
The Sing A Long Family (1962)
Tooter Turtle (1960–1962)
Twinkles the Elephant (1960–1967)
Underdog (1964–1967)
Gene Hattree (1964)
Cauliflower Cabby (1964)
The Colossal Show  (1964)

Much of Total Television's library for post-network syndication was handled by The Program Exchange, until the company shut down in 2016. The rights are currently owned by DreamWorks Classics/DreamWorks Animation (via Universal Pictures and NBCUniversal).

Notes

External links
 "Whatever Happened to Total TeleVision productions?," Hogan's Alley #15, 2009

Further reading
 Mark Arnold (historian); 

 
American animation studios
Television production companies of the United States
Defunct mass media companies of the United States
Entertainment companies based in New York City
Entertainment companies established in 1959
Mass media companies established in 1959
Mass media companies disestablished in 1969
1959 establishments in New York (state)
1969 disestablishments in New York (state)
DreamWorks Classics
General Mills